Keith Sharman Turner is a New Zealand businessman.  He is a Fellow of Engineering New Zealand.

In September 2007, New Zealand Listener magazine placed Turner in 14th position in its 2007 Power List of the 50 most powerful people in New Zealand, down from 12th in the 2006 Power List and 42nd place in  2005.

Career
Turner's early career was in the New Zealand electricity industry, in which he began in 1969.
 Managing director, DesignPower, a professional engineering consultancy to the electricity industry
 Chief Operating Officer, Electricity Corporation of New Zealand prior to its breakup in 1999
 Chief Executive, Meridian Energy, 1999 to 2008.
 Deputy Chairman, Auckland International Airport, Director since 2004
 Director, Spark Infrastructure
 Chairman, Fisher & Paykel 2011
 Member of the Interim Climate Change Committee, 2018

Renewable energy
Turner has expressed interest in social, economic and environmental sustainability, and renewable energy in New Zealand.  In The case for renewable generation in 2004 he said: "The choices we make – you and I and the rest of New Zealand – the choices we make over the next few years, are going to shape the energy structure of our society for at least the next one, and possibly the next two, generations".

According to Turner, a viable transmission grid is an important ingredient of his renewable energy strategy. He has been critical of the lack of investment in the electricity transmission grid in New Zealand by the state-owned enterprise Transpower. In November 2005, he advised that "New Zealand's electricity grid is so overworked that some lines cannot be taken out for servicing", which was vindicated by the 2006 Auckland Blackout, when half of Auckland lost power during a storm because an earth wire snapped and fell on switching equipment.

Turner is part owner of Waitaki Wind Limited, a company investigating wind farms in Otago.

References 

Living people
20th-century New Zealand businesspeople
21st-century New Zealand businesspeople
20th-century New Zealand engineers
21st-century New Zealand engineers
Year of birth missing (living people)
Pukerua Bay Residents